Atletico Argentino de Mendoza is a football team from Mendoza, Argentina.

As of 2009/10 they were playing  in the Torneo Argentino B (4th level), although they were relegated at the end of the season.

See also
Argentine football league system

References

Football clubs in Mendoza Province